The Jose and Wally Show Starring Vic Sotto is a Philippine comedy series on TV5 starring Jose Manalo, Wally Bayola and Vic Sotto.

Synopsis
The Jose and Wally Show Starring Vic Sotto is a show-within-a-show. The plot revolves around two has-been comedians/TV hosts Jose de Leoncio (Manalo) and Wally Revilla (Bayola) whose last remaining shows are being axed by their respective home studios for faring poorly in ratings and their skits are only repetitive. Playing savior to both is Direk Vic (Sotto) an excellent TV director, forced to unify rivals Revilla and Leoncio in a show despite their bickering. He ends up producing a show featuring the two "frenemies" (friends and enemies) on a newly opened TV station. In the upper echelon is an executive (Boboy Garovillo) who oversees everything and has a huge amount of money to spend and gamble. His former beauty queen-wife Maxene (Miriam Quiambao) will meddle in the operations and help her starlet niece, Tennessee or Tenten (Dianne Medina) in advancing the latter's acting career. On and off stage, Jose and Wally will try to upstage each other and prove who is the better comedian-host between them. They shoots a show titled "Tawa O Talo", a parody of their former show, "L.O.L: Laugh Or Lose". Despite rivalries, they remained professional.

Cast and characters

Main cast
 Jose Manalo as Jose de Leoncio
 Wally Bayola as Wally Revilla
 Vic Sotto as Direk Vic/Direk Vic Sotto

Supporting cast
 Boboy Garovillo as Boss Ramon
 Miriam Quiambao as Maxene
 Dianne Medina as Tennessee
 Niña Jose as Janna
 Erika Padilla as Erika
 Mcoy Fundales as Mcoy
 Jimmy Santos as Jimboy
 Roi Calilong as Roi
 Marnie Lapuz as Miss Ethel
 Cali Semana as Shirley

Other recurring characters
 CJ Mangahis as Carmel Revilla
 Keshia Dee as Lucy de Leoncio
 Angel Satsumi as Jinggam Bell / Cherry Revilla
 Macky Billones as Jigo de Leoncio
 Dennis dela Cruz as Sir Tony
 Rodjun Cruz as Clarence Cecilio
 Ana Abad Santos as Mrs. Tiu
 Victor Silayan as Kyle Esposo
 Arnell Ignacio as Trulala
 Arci Muñoz as Alexandra Vergara

See also
 List of programs aired by The 5 Network

References

External links
 
 

TV5 (Philippine TV network) original programming
Philippine comedy television series
Philippine television sitcoms
2011 Philippine television series debuts
2012 Philippine television series endings
Filipino-language television shows